Douglas Campbell may refer to:

 Douglas Lloyd Campbell (1895–1995), Premier of Manitoba, 1948–1958
 Douglas Campbell (actor) (1922–2009), Scottish-born Canadian actor and director
 Douglas Campbell, Green Party candidate for governor in Michigan
 Douglas Houghton Campbell (1859–1953), American botanist
 Douglas Munro Campbell (1889–1986), politician in Ontario, Canada
 Douglas Campbell (aviator) (1896–1990), American World War I flying ace
 Douglas R. Campbell (born 1945), Canadian Federal judge
 Douglas Campbell (soil conservator) (1906–1969), New Zealand teacher and soil conservator
 Douglas Campbell (swimmer) (born 1960), Scottish swimmer 
 Doug Campbell, American guitarist
 Dougie Campbell (1901–1991), Scottish-American soccer player
 Dugald Campbell, Scottish doctor who set up a national health service in Hawaii
 Alexander Douglas Campbell (1899–1980), British Army general
 Douglas C. Campbell, COO of Sears Canada
 William Douglas Campbell, lobbyist and FBI informant 2017–2018, associated with the Uranium One controversy